Asthenargoides is a genus of Asian dwarf spiders that was first described by K. Y. Eskov in 1993.  it contains only three species: A. kurenstchikovi, A. kurtchevae, and A. logunovi.

See also
 List of Linyphiidae species

References

Araneomorphae genera
Linyphiidae
Spiders of Russia